The List of free-trade agreements has been split into:
 List of multilateral free-trade agreements
 List of bilateral free-trade agreements